|}

This is a list of electoral district results of the 2008 Western Australian election.

Results by Electoral district

Albany

Alfred Cove

Armadale

Balcatta

Bassendean

Bateman

Belmont

Blackwood-Stirling

Bunbury

Cannington

Carine

Central Wheatbelt

Churchlands

Cockburn

Collie-Preston

Cottesloe

Darling Range

Dawesville

Eyre

Forrestfield

Fremantle

Geraldton

Girrawheen

Gosnells

Hillarys

Jandakot

Joondalup

Kalamunda

Kalgoorlie

Kimberley

Kingsley

Kwinana

Mandurah

Maylands

Midland

Mindarie

Moore

Morley

Mount Lawley

Murray-Wellington

Nedlands

Nollamara

North West

Ocean Reef

Perth

Pilbara

Riverton

Rockingham

Scarborough

South Perth

Southern River

Swan Hills

Vasse

Victoria Park

Wagin

Wanneroo

Warnbro

West Swan

Willagee

See also 

 Results of the Western Australian state election, 2008 (Legislative Council)
 2008 Western Australian state election
 Candidates of the Western Australian state election, 2008
 Members of the Western Australian Legislative Assembly, 2008–2013

References 

Results of Western Australian elections
2008 elections in Australia